Alive and Well... In Krakow, (a.k.a. Alive and Well... Who am I?) is Green Carnation's first live DVD, released under the Metal Mind Records label in August 2004.

The DVD contains the entire live show, bonus audio selections, interviews, biographies, discography, a photo gallery, bootleg videos and full 5.1 Surround Sound.

Background 
This live recording was made in Kraków in January 2004 and was released on 3 August 2004.

The band performed a variety of songs from their albums, including the first 22 minutes of their album Light of Day, Day of Darkness.

Contents

Concert 
Disc 1
 "Into Deep" – 6:58
 "Crushed to Dust" – 4:22
 "Writings on the Wall" – 5:00
 "Light of Day, Day of Darkness, 1st Part" – 22:51
 "The Boy In the Attic" – 5:58
 "Myron & Cole" – 5:40
 "Rain" – 5:49
 "As Life Flows By" – 5:35

Non-concert (part of disc 1)
 Recording of drums "Into Deep" (Bonus Video)
 "Crushed to Dust" bootleg video (Bonus Video)
 "Boy in the Attic" bootleg video (Bonus Video)
 "Writings on the Wall" bootleg video (Bonus Video)

Bonus material 
Disc 2
 "Into Deep" (acoustic version)
 "Crushed to Dust" (acoustic version)
 "The Boy in the Attic" (acoustic version)
 "Myron & Cole" (acoustic version)
 "Stay on These Roads" (A-Ha cover)
 "Wicked Game (cover)" (Chris Isaak cover)
 "This Is the End" (2004 demo)

 Bonus audio tracks: acoustic versions of four tracks from their last album, two covers plus a very exclusive pre-production demo track from the album The Quiet Offspring.
 Fully animated menu
 Band biography and individual members' biographies, discographies and equipment lists
 35-minute-long band interview
 Discography
 Studio diary from recording A Blessing in Disguise
 Photo gallery
 Art gallery
 Desktop images
 Weblinks
 DVD in Dolby Digital 5.1 Surround Sound

Personnel 
 Terje Vik Schei (a.k.a. Tchort) – guitar, lyrics
 Stein Roger Sordal – bass guitar, vocals, guitar, lyrics
 Kjetil Nordhus – vocals, lyrics
 Oystein Tonnessen – piano, keyboards
 Michael Krumins – guitar
 Anders Kobro – drums

References

External links
 Official website

Green Carnation albums
Live video albums
2004 video albums
2004 live albums